Like for Likes (Korean: 좋아해줘) is a 2016 South Korean romantic comedy film directed by Park Hyun-jin. It was released in South Korea on February 17, 2016, by CJ Entertainment.

Plot
The movie follows three couples relying on social media to communicate their innermost feelings.

Recently discharged from the military, Noh Jin-woo (Yoo Ah-in) is a popular actor. Jo Kyung-ah (Lee Mi-yeon) is a screenwriter for television drama series. She doesn't want to ask Jin-woo, but asks him anyway to perform in her next drama series. Jin-woo turns down her offer. At a wedding, Jin-woo sees Kyung-ah's young child Bom. Jin-woo wonders if he is the father.

Jung Sung-chan (Kim Joo-hyuk) runs a small Japanese restaurant. Before his wedding, he leases an apartment from flight attendant Ham Joo-ran (Choi Ji-woo), but Sung-chan is dumped by his fiancé. At the same time, flight attendant Joo-ran learns that she was ripped off and now doesn't have a place to stay. Sung-chan offers to share the apartment with her.

Lee Soo-ho (Kang Ha-neul) is a songwriter. He is also deaf from a car accident that he was involved in, during high school. Soo-ho has never had a girlfriend. He is a regular customer at Sung-chan's Japanese restaurant. One day, at Sung-chan's restaurant, he meets drama series producer Jang Na-yeon (Esom). They have a good time eating and drinking together. After exchanging messages on Facebook, Soo-ho and Na-yeon go on a few dates together. Soo-ho is unable to tell her about his hearing disability.

Cast
Lee Mi-yeon as Jo Kyung-ah
Choi Ji-woo as Ham Joo-ran
Kim Joo-hyuk as Jung Sung-chan 
Yoo Ah-in as Noh Jin-woo 
Kang Ha-neul as Lee Soo-ho 
Esom as Jang Na-yeon
Han Jae-young as Jung Il-kyu
Baek Chang-min as Jung Ui-joo
Park Hee-von as Jung Ui-joo's mother 
Heo Jung-do as Director Heo
Lee Jung-eun as Real estate office middle-aged woman
Jin Sun-mi as Ham Joo-ran's friend
Go Hyun as Noh Jin-woo's manager 
Jung Yoo-jin as Lead actress 
Ji Yoon-ho as Jae-byung
Im Chae-sun as Delivery man
Lee Seung-yeon as Chief flight attendant
Park Seul-gi as Reporter 
Choi Young-do as CEO Kim
Jo Dae-hee as CEO Jang
Kim Seung-hoon as Representative Kim
Park Myung-shin as New drama series screenwriter
Sung Do-hyun as New drama series PD
Sun Joo-ah as Jae-byung's girlfriend 
Ha Seok-jin as Kang Min-ho (cameo)

Reception
The film was third placed on its opening weekend in South Korea, grossing .

References

External links

2016 romantic comedy films
South Korean romantic comedy films
CJ Entertainment films
Films about social media
2010s South Korean films